is a 1973 film directed by Shiro Moritani. It is based on the 1973 novel Japan Sinks by Sakyo Komatsu. The film stars Keiju Kobayashi, Hiroshi Fujioka and Ayumi Ishida.

Synopsis
Thirty million years ago, the country of Japan was part of the continent of Asia, and has since split off into its own archipelago. Another landmass shift is about to occur.

In the present day, geophysicist Dr. Tadokoro and Onodera Toshio take the submarine Wadatsumi-1 to the Ogasawara Islands, in order to investigate tremors in the seafloor. They discover that the land mass of the Japanese islands is collapsing into the Japan trench.

Afterward, Onodera is introduced to Abe Reiko, and the two become lovers. Relaxing on the beach, they witness an eruption of Mt. Amagi. A meeting of government officials, including Prime Minister Yamamoto, focuses on assessing the disaster. Dr. Tadokoro warns that more eruptions and earthquakes are imminent, but his claims are rejected as alarmist. He later meets with a mysterious wealthy man named Mr. Watari, who agrees to fund the doctor’s research expeditions. With this funding, he develops a course of action to address a nationwide earthquake disaster. During a meeting to secure a research submarine from France, the volcano Kirishima erupts.

Onodera leaves his job as a submarine pilot to help Dr. Tadokoro full-time. Further research verifies that the Japanese archipelago will be pulled into the ocean. This is immediately followed by a massive earthquake in Tokyo causing immense damage and loss of life.

Three months later, Tokyo is slowly recovering. The Prime Minister, who lost his wife in the earthquake, works closely with Mr. Watari and Dr. Tadokoro’s team. Their assessment is that another even larger earthquake is on the horizon.

Dr. Tadokoro and his team meet with Mr. Watari at his secluded mountainside home. The doctor reveals his two-phase plan: D1-investigating seismic activity in the Japan Trench, and D2-an evacuation of the Japanese islands. The Prime Minister is negotiating with countries to accept refugees. Mr. Watari describes three options for Plan D2. One is the formation of a new country, a second is immigration and integration into other countries, and a third is a non-response that means passive acceptance of Japan’s fate. Onodera, drunk and agonizing over the public’s ignorance of the impending disaster, meets Abe Reiko for the first time since the Tokyo earthquake.

The Japanese Meteorological Agency reveals devastating news; the original 2-year timeline for Japan’s sinking is inaccurate, shrinking to just 10 months. Immigration negotiations are sped up, though countries such as South Korea, China and Taiwan are refusing to participate. Shipping and air transport production are increased, and a full announcement of Japan’s fate is released to the public nationwide. Onodera plans to marry Reiko and meet her in Geneva, but they are separated when a new earthquake triggers an eruption of Mt. Fuji.

A United Nations summit discusses possible locations for Japan’s population. In two months, 2.8 million Japanese have successfully evacuated; the low number frustrates Prime Minister Yamamoto. Japan’s sinking accelerates, with the Kii Peninsula and Shikoku submerged. The United States, China and the Soviet Union agree to accept large numbers of refugees, but evacuation estimates only increase to 8 million per month. The Sanriku coast, Tohoku district, Kyushu, Hokkaido and Okinawa are submerged. 63 million Japanese remain on the archipelago, 57% of the original population.

Eleven days before Japan is expected to completely sink, Onodera is shown engaged in rescue efforts, while hoping to reunite with Reiko. Prime Minister Yamamoto later announces a cessation of all JSDF rescue operations.

Mr. Watari, on his deathbed, has a final meeting with Dr. Tadokoro and the Prime Minister. The doctor states that he will remain in Japan until the end, and expresses his confidence in the Prime Minister’s leadership ability with the Japanese people’s uncertain future. A helicopter takes the Prime Minister to safety. a final view from space shows that all of Japan has sunk into the ocean.

Cast

Author Sakyo Komatsu has an uncredited cameo role in a scene where Onodera and Yoshimura have a meeting.

Release
Submersion of Japan was released in Japan on 29 December 1973 where it was distributed by Toho.

American version

Roger Corman bought the U.S. rights to the film for his New World Pictures. He cut out a great deal of footage, added new sequences directed by Andrew Meyer and starring Lorne Greene as an ambassador at the United Nations, and released it as Tidal Wave in May 1975.

The American version of the film's new cast members also included Rhonda Leigh Hopkins, John Fukioka, Marvin Miller, Susan Sennett, Ralph James, Phil Roth, Cliff Pellow, and Joe Dante. New World additionally released an uncut subtitled format as Submersion of Japan.

Box office
The film was the highest grossing film in Japan in 1973 and 1974. The film grossed more than twice of the second-highest grossing film of the year, Human Revolution. The film earned  in Japan. It surpassed The Godfather as the highest-grossing film in Japan until overtaken in December 1974 by The Exorcist.

The film was a big success at the United States box office.

References

Sources

External links
US edit/English-dubbed Tidal Wave
Original Japanese cut of Japan Sinks

Japanese Wikipedia

1973 action films
Japanese disaster films
1973 films
Toho tokusatsu films
Films scored by Masaru Sato
Films produced by Tomoyuki Tanaka
Films based on Japanese novels
Films based on science fiction novels
1970s Japanese films